Roberto Conrado "Gray" Kelly (born October 1, 1964) is a Panamanian baseball manager and former professional baseball outfielder in Major League Baseball. He was signed by the New York Yankees as an amateur free agent in 1982 and went on to play for them (1987–1992 and 2000), the Cincinnati Reds (1993–1994), Atlanta Braves (1994), Montreal Expos (1995), Los Angeles Dodgers (1995), Minnesota Twins (1996–1997), Seattle Mariners (1997) and Texas Rangers (1998–1999). During his playing days in Panama, he was known as La Sombra, Spanish for Shadow. After his playing career, he managed the Giants' single-A team, the Augusta GreenJackets and later became a coach for the Giants major league team. He is currently the manager of the Sultanes de Monterrey of the Mexican League.

Playing career
Kelly was a member of four playoff teams in his career, having helped the Dodgers win the 1995 NL West Division, the Mariners win the 1997 AL West, and the Rangers win the 1998 and 1999 AL Western Division. (Kelly played ten games for the 2000 American League East-winning New York Yankees, but played his final game on April 18, long before the playoffs.)

Kelly named to the 1992 American League All-Star team as well as the 1993 National League All-Star team.

Kelly also broke up Toronto Blue Jays pitcher Dave Stieb's perfect game at SkyDome in 1989 with a 2-out double in the 9th inning.

He was traded along with Tony Tarasco and Esteban Yan from the Braves to the Expos for Marquis Grissom on April 6, 1995.

In 14 seasons, he played in 1,337 games and had 4,797 at bats, 687 runs, 1,390 hits, 241 doubles, 30 triples, 124 home runs, 585 RBI, 235 stolen bases, 317 walks, a .290 batting average, a .337 on-base percentage and a .430 slugging percentage. Defensively, he recorded a .985 fielding percentage as an outfielder.

Coaching career
On November 16, 2007, Kelly was hired as the San Francisco Giants' new first base coach and hitting instructor. As a manager of the Augusta GreenJackets, he gained a reputation for his aggressive approach to baserunning. In February 2008, he told Giants pitchers that he didn't want them to use the fact that they were pitchers as an excuse for poor baserunning.

On January 17, 2018, Kelly was announced as the new manager for the Sultanes de Monterrey of the Mexican Baseball League for the next 3 seasons.

Personal life

Kelly is married to Blanca Gonzalez Kelly, sister of Juan González, and has seven sons, named Roberto Jr., Roberto Bryan, Xavier, Ryan, Johaun, Jacques and Jadrien. He also has three daughters named Charlene, Rhianna and Bianca.

References

External links

1964 births
Living people
Albany-Colonie Yankees players
American League All-Stars
Atlanta Braves players
Cincinnati Reds players
Colorado Springs Sky Sox players
Columbus Clippers players
Diablos Rojos del México players
Fort Lauderdale Yankees players
Fort Myers Miracle players
Greensboro Hornets players
Gulf Coast Yankees players
Los Angeles Dodgers players
Major League Baseball center fielders
Major League Baseball first base coaches
Major League Baseball players from Panama
Mexican League baseball managers
Mexican League baseball outfielders
Minnesota Twins players
Minor league baseball managers
Montreal Expos players
National League All-Stars
New York Yankees players
Oneonta Yankees players
Panamanian expatriate baseball players in Canada
Panamanian expatriate baseball players in Mexico
Panamanian expatriate baseball players in the United States
San Francisco Giants coaches
Seattle Mariners players
Sportspeople from Panama City
Texas Rangers players